This is a list of Chinese mathematicians. With a history spanning over three millennia, Chinese mathematics is believed to have initially developed largely independently of other cultures.

Classical Chinese mathematicians
Jing Fang: 78 – 37 BC
Liu Xin: c. 50 BC – 23 AD
Zhang Heng: 78 – 139 AD
Liu Hong: 129 – 210 AD
Cai Yong: 132 – 192 AD
Liu Hui: 225 – 295 AD 
Wang Fan: 228 – 266 AD
Sun Tzu: c. 3rd – 5th century AD
Zu Chongzhi: 429 – 500 AD
Zu Gengzhi: c. 450 – c. 520 AD

Middle Imperial Chinese mathematicians
Zhen Luan: 535–566
Wang Xiaotong: 580–640
Li Chunfeng: 602–670
Yi Xing: 683–727
Wei Pu: 11th century
Jia Xian: 1010–1070
Su Song: 1020–1101
Shen Kuo: 1031–1095
Li Zhi: 1192–1279
Qin Jiushao: c. 1202–1261
Guo Shoujing: 1231–1316
Yang Hui: c. 1238–1298
Zhu Shijie: 1249–1314

Late Imperial Chinese mathematicians
Cheng Dawei: 1533–1606
Zhu Zaiyu: 1536–1611
Xu Guangqi: 1562–1633
Minggatu: 1692–1763
Li Rui: 1768–1817
Li Shanlan: 1810–1882
Xiong Qinglai: 1893–1969
Su Buqing: 1902–2003
Pao-Lu Hsu: 1910–1970
Hua Luogeng: 1910–1985
Ke Zhao: 1910–2002
Shiing-Shen Chern: 1911–2004
Wei-Liang Chow: 1911–1995

Modern Chinese mathematicians
Shiing-Shen Chern: 1911–2004
Chien Wei-zang: 1912–2010
Ky Fan: 1914–2010
Chia-Chiao Lin: 1916–2013
Wu Wenjun: 1919–2017
Yuan-Shih Chow: 1924–2022
Gu Chaohao: 1926–2012
Daoxing Xia: b. 1930
Wang Yuan: 1930–2021
Chen Jingrun: 1933–1996
Pan Chengdong: 1934–1997
Yum-Tong Siu: b. 1943
Peng Shige: b. 1947
Shing-Tung Yau: b. 1949, Fields medal recipient
Yitang Zhang: b. 1955
Gang Tian: b. 1958
Jeffrey Yi-Lin Forrest: b. 1959
Huai-Dong Cao: b. 1959
Shou-Wu Zhang: b. 1962
Weinan E: b. 1963
Kefeng Liu: b. 1965
Terence Tao: b.1975
Wei Zhang: b. 1981
Zhiwei Yun: b. 1982
Chenyang Xu: b. 1981
Eddie Woo: b. 1985

Chinese